"Take It Away" is a single by Paul McCartney from his 1982 album Tug of War.  The single spent sixteen weeks on the Billboard Hot 100 singles chart, reaching #10 and spending five consecutive weeks at that position. It reached #15 in the UK. The music video, directed by John Makenzie, features former Beatles drummer Ringo Starr and long-time producer George Martin, both of whom played on the track, as well as actor John Hurt and Linda McCartney.

Billboard called it "a superior single that fuses a driving rhythm with a sleek, polished production" and said it was McCartney's "most assured, seamless, irresistible" single since the mid-1970s.  Cash Box said that it's a "dense, multi-layered pop confection" that "keeps the listener on his/her toes throughout the song, going from a lazy tropical-type rhythm to a galloping brass section."  Ultimate Classic Rock critic Nick DeRiso rated it as the best song on Tug of War, stating that it starts "with an off-kilter rhythm courtesy of Ringo Starr and all of the tasteful hallmarks of a George Martin production" and becomes "one of McCartney's patented pop confections, featuring a feverish horn counterpoint, deceptively intricate bass, and an utterly indecipherable narrative."  DeRiso also praises Eric Stewart's backing vocals.

Although there is a segue from "Tug of War" into this song on the album, the single version instead starts cleanly but fades out earlier at the end.

Track listings
7" single
 "Take It Away" – 3:59
 "I'll Give You a Ring" – 3:05

12" single (black vinyl everywhere else; clear yellow vinyl in Japan)
 "Take It Away" – 3:59
 "I'll Give You a Ring" – 3:05
 "Dress Me Up as a Robber" – 2:40

Personnel
"Take It Away"
Paul McCartney – lead and backing vocals, bass, acoustic guitar, piano
Linda McCartney – backing vocals 
Eric Stewart – backing vocals
Ringo Starr – drums
Steve Gadd – drums
George Martin – electric piano

"I'll Give You a Ring"
Paul McCartney – vocals, electric guitar, bass, piano, drums 
Tony Coe – clarinet
Linda McCartney – backing vocals
Eric Stewart – backing vocals

Chart performance

Weekly charts

Year-end charts

References

1982 singles
Paul McCartney songs
Songs written by Paul McCartney
Parlophone singles
Song recordings produced by George Martin
Music published by MPL Music Publishing
1982 songs